Ablattaria laevigata is a species of burying beetle or carrion beetle belonging to the family Silphidae.

Description

It has a semielliptical pronotum, which is not narrowed. Elytral punctuation is dense, with sparse thicker punctures.

These beetles are predators of terrestrial snails (Theba pisana, Monacha species, Xeropicta species, and Candidula species). They are able to penetrate the snail shells.

Distribution
This species is present in most of Europe and in the Near East.

References

Silphidae
Beetles described in 1775
Taxa named by Johan Christian Fabricius